is a railway station on the Kagoshima Main Line operated by Kyushu Railway Company in Koga, Fukuoka Prefecture, Japan. The name of the station was officially announced by JR Kyushu on September 24, 2008. Until then, the station was provisionally called Shishibu Station but was written in kanji as "鹿部駅".

Lines

Layout
The station consists of two opposed side platforms serving two tracks.

Adjacent stations

History
The station was opened by JR Kyushu on 14 March 2009 as an added station on the existing Kagoshima Main Line track.

See also 
List of railway stations in Japan

References

External links
Shishibu (JR Kyushu)

Railway stations in Fukuoka Prefecture
Railway stations in Japan opened in 2009